Black mark or blackmark may refer to:

 Blackmark, 1971 Gil Kane graphic novel
 Black Mark Production, Swedish record production company
 Under the Sign of the Black Mark, a 1987 album by Bathory, a seminal release on the label

See also 
 
 
 
 Black Spot (disambiguation)